Tadbaba Maryam, also called Tadbaba Zion in ancient times (meaning "tabernacle of St Mary/Zion"), is an Ethiopian Orthodox Tewahedo church located in the place of Sayint in South Wollo, Amhara Region, Ethiopia. The current church bears the title in full "Head of Churches and Monasteries Tadbaba Maryam" (also in ).

History 
Tadbaba Maryam was amongst the first four Temples where sacrificial offerings were implemented in Ethiopia before birth of Jesus.  The name is a combination two Ge'ez words: Tadbaba means Tabernacle, Maryam/ Tsion means Zion which gives 'The Tabernacle of Zion'. According to the chronicle of the Tadbaba Maryam, the Ark of Tadbaba Maryam arrived in 982 BCE which coincides with disappearance of the Ark of the Covenant or the reign of King Solomon (between 970 and 931 BCE).

Construction 
The current church of Tadbaba Maryam is spectacular in its design and was founded by Emperor Gelawdewos after he won the war with Ahmad ibn Ibrahim al-Ghazi, the Battle of Wayna Daga. The Ark was carried into the Battle of Wayna Daga, the final battle against Ahmad ibn Ibrahim al-Ghazi, where Gelawdewos cut off the Imam's head. Prior to Gelawdewos, while kept in the Tabernacle, the Ark was moved around, but was eventually placed in the Temple founded by King Gelawdewos.

The church is a circular complex with four doors (>3m height) and 32 windows (>2m height) on the outside. By design, the church is arranged in concentric circles with three sections. The inner most section at the center being the inner sanctum (Holy of Holies) and is about 24 meters in diameter. This is where the Ark of the Covenant is believed to be kept, explicitly inside a tent (Tabernacle). In its current form, the church overall measures about 34 meters in diameter.

Religious activity 
The high priest are always selected from tribes of the priestly class, believed to be descendants of Jews. In additions, Deacons, only under the age of 9, are allowed to deliver service. Most of the relics and utilities used in the church are made of pure gold including incense burner (censer with chain). When entering the Holy of Holies, a rope is tied to high priest to enable assistants to safely pull body of the high priest out of the inner-sanctum in the event of mishap. Abuna Takla Haymanot, 3rd Patriarch of EOC, attempted to enter the Holy of Holies and was pulled out by a rope, but died a year later in 1988.

A story is told about a plague that infested the land following an event of mishap in front of the Ark during an annual festivity. Later the people of the land were also afflicted of boils and disease. Since then, the Ark has never been carried outside of its tent or shown to the people during congregation.

Treasures gallery 
Tadbaba Maryam possesses a huge collection of treasures, some of them date back to the time of the Old Testament. The collections are now displayed in a museum  inside the churches compound. The most known relics include:

An ancient cross with special design on it in the form of a Sheep. Also called Na'wa Bagu, (Behold the Lamb).
The Shield of Atse Kaleb used in defeating the rebellious faction in Yemen.
Hebrew Synodus.
Liturgy in Aramaic language.
Books written in Aramaic language.
Several books written in Ge'ez and Arabic language.
Gospel decorated with Gold.
Hand cross used by the first Ethiopian Patriarch.
Cross Used by St. John the Baptist.
Hand cross used by Abune Echege Yohannes.
Hand cross used by Abune Anorios.
Hand cross used by Abune Kerlos.
A section of the hair of Saint Anne (the mother of St. Mary).
A collection of remains of innocent children massacred by king Herod.
Relics of St. George (the thumb bone).
Relics of other unspecified martyrs (about 28 skeletons).
Remains of more than 6 kings including Galawdewos.
Throne of Emperor Dawit I
The Book of Adam.
More than 1000 unspecified manuscripts.
St. Luke Ikons of St. Mary. Also called Se'el Adheno (The Saving Picture).
Several unspecified hand crosses.
Various unspecified ancient relics.
Gifts provided by various kings and Patriarchs.
A signed collection of the Miracles of Mary, paintings by Brancaleon.

See also 
 Church of Our Lady Mary of Zion

References

Further reading 
 Chronicle of King Gälawdewos, Solomon Gebreyes. Chronicle of King Gälawdewos (1540-1559)
 Social and Political History of Wollo Province in Ethiopia: 1769–1916. Misganaw Tadesse Melaku
 A History of Ethiopia: Volume II (Routledge Revivals): Nubia and Abyssinia, E. A. Wallis Budge (P 346; 351; 350; 353).

External links 
  Tadbaba Maryam (Tadbaba Zion, ርዕሰ አድባራት ወገዳማት ተድባበ ማርያም) (article and photos)

Ethiopian Orthodox Tewahedo church buildings